The Ryedale Show is an agricultural show which takes place at the Welburn Park Showground, Welburn, Kirkbymoorside, North Yorkshire in the North of England annually on the last Tuesday of July. It is organised and run by the Ryedale Agricultural Society. In recent years the Ryedale Show has become the largest one-day agricultural show in the north of England.

It features several agricultural show staples such as features of Equestrianism and competition between farmers as to the quality of Livestock.

History
Established in 1855, the Ryedale show has run almost continuously for over one hundred-and-fifty years.
In 2007 the show was cancelled for the second time ever because of torrential rain the preceding week and a waterlogged show field. It was cancelled in 2020 because of the COVID-19 pandemic.

References

Agricultural shows in Yorkshire
Tourist attractions in North Yorkshire
Festivals established in 1855
1855 establishments in England